The Future Is Medium is the second studio album by Irish rock band Compulsion, released on 27 May 1996. It was produced by Mark Freegard and Garret Lee; Freegard handled recording (with engineer Darren Mahomed) and mixing (engineer Steven Cook). The band promoted the album with a UK tour in June and July 1996 with Evil Superstars.

Reception

AllMusic reviewer Jack Rabid wrote that while The Future Is Medium was not as "heavy, proud, and mighty as Comforter," the former was "just as edgy and takes more chances". Marcus Schleutermann of Rock Hard wrote that the punk boom would end that summer but Compulsion would remain due to having "enough identity of their own to be able to survive in the long term". He explained that the tracks had "plenty of nooks and crannies without affecting their accessibility". In a review for NME, Kitty Empire wrote that Freehard helped the band give "birth to 16 songs so bouncy they could punch a hole in your hi-fi casing". She added that the album was "chock-a-block with lethal hooks that dig in and fester, buzzing with the kind of riffs that have you cartwheeling".

Track listing
Track listing per booklet.

 "All We Heard Was a Dull Thud" – 4:01
 "Question Time for the Proles" – 3:56
 "Juvenile Scene Detective" – 3:37
 "It's Great" – 2:23
 "They're Breeding the Grey Things Again" – 2:44
 "Fast Song" – 1:51
 "Western Culture Collector" – 3:21
 "Happy Monster" – 2:57
 "Belly Laugh" – 2:37
 "Is This Efficient Living?" – 3:00
 "Down the Edifice" – 2:51
 "Happy Ending" – 3:38
 "Burst" – 1:02
 "Lost on Abbey Road" – 2:05
 "Spotlight Into Space" – 1:08
 "Me" – 4:28

Personnel
Personnel per booklet.

Compulsion
 Josephmary – vocals, trombone
 Garret Lee – guitar, vocals, electronics
 Sid Rainey – bass
 Jan-Willem Alkema – drums

Production and design
 Mark Freegard – producer, recording, mixing
 Garret Lee – producer, design, artwork
 Darren Mahomed – assistant recording engineer
 Steven Cook – assistant mix engineer
 Andrew Sutton – design, artwork
 Mike Diver – group photo

References

1996 albums
Compulsion (band) albums
One Little Independent Records albums